Culham Court is a Grade II* listed house at Remenham in the English county of Berkshire.

History
Culham Court dates back to at least the medieval period. In the late 1760s, the original house was bought by London lawyer, Richard Michell, whose personal fortune was based on his marriage to an Antiguan sugar heiress, but it burnt down whilst being repaired.

The current house was built in 1771 by the architect Sir William Chambers, for Robert Mitchell.

In 1893, the house was tenanted by Sir Henry Barber, 1st Baronet and his wife. He died in 1927 and she in 1933.

Later owners included the newspaper owner Cecil Harmsworth King.

In 1949, the house was bought by the financier Michael Behrens, later co-owner of Ionian Bank, and his wife Felicity. Their artist son Timothy Behrens grew up there, and would entertain friends including Hugh Casson and Edward Ardizzone. Behrens died in 1989, but Felicity lived there until 1996.

In 1997, the house was bought by Sir Martyn Arbib for his daughter, Annabel (married to businessman Paddy Nicoll). Arbib bought it for £12 million, and in 2006, they sold it to Swiss-born British billionaire Urs Schwarzenbach for £35 million, £10 million above the asking price.

References

External links

Grade II* listed buildings in Berkshire
Buildings and structures on the River Thames
Houses completed in 1771
Grade II* listed houses
Country houses in Berkshire
Remenham